Vineet Saran is a former Judge of Supreme Court of India and current Ethics officer and ombudsman in Board of Control for Cricket in India (BCCI). He is former Chief Justice of Orissa High Court. He is also former Judge of Karnataka High Court and Allahabad High Court.

Career 
Justice Vineet Saran was born on 11 May 1957. He was enrolled as an Advocate on 28 July 1980. He practiced before the Allahabad High Court in all matters. He was appointed a permanent Judge of the Allahabad High Court on 14 February 2002. He was thereafter transferred to Karnataka High Court on 16 February 2015 and was appointed Chief Justice of Orissa High Court on 26 February 2016. 

He was appointed as a Judge of Supreme Court of India on 7 August 2018. He retired on 10 May 2022.

References

Chief Justices of the Orissa High Court
21st-century Indian judges
Living people
Justices of the Supreme Court of India
1957 births
University of Allahabad alumni
Judges of the Allahabad High Court
Judges of the Karnataka High Court